The 1999–2000 Oregon Ducks men's basketball team represented the University of Oregon as a member of the Pacific-10 Conference during the 1999–2000 NCAA Division I men's basketball season. The team was led by third-year head coach Ernie Kent and played their home games at McArthur Court in Eugene, Oregon. The Ducks finished third in the Pac-10 regular season standings, and received an at-large bid to the NCAA tournament. Playing as the No. 7 seed in the East region, Oregon lost to No. 10 seed Seton Hall, 72–71 in overtime. The team finished with a record of 22–8 (13–5 Pac-10).

Roster

Schedule and results

|-
!colspan=9 style=| Regular Season

|-
!colspan=9 style=| NCAA Tournament

Rankings

References

Oregon Ducks men's basketball seasons
Oregon
Oregon
Oregon
Oregon